Glyptoactis is a mostly extinct genus of bivalves in the family Carditidae. They have been recovered from the Castle Hayne Limestone geologic formation in North Carolina and in France.

Subgenera and species 
Subgenera:

 †Glyptoactis (Claibornicardia) Stenzel and Krause, 1957
 †Glyptoactis (Fasciculicardia) Maxwell, 1969
 Glyptoactis (Glyptoactis) Stewart, 1930

Species according to the World Register of Marine Species :

 †Glyptoactis acanthodes (Suter, 1917)
 †Glyptoactis allophyla P. A. Maxwell, 1992
 †Glyptoactis bartrumi (C. A. Fleming, 1950)
 †Glyptoactis benhami (Thomson, 1908)
 †Glyptoactis faceta (Suter, 1917)
 †Glyptoactis hadra (Dall, 1903)
 †Glyptoactis healyi (C. A. Fleming, 1950)
 †Glyptoactis hebertiana (d'Orbigny, 1850)
 †Glyptoactis nuntia (Marwick, 1928)
 †Glyptoactis subintermedia (Suter, 1917)
 Glyptoactis wendellwoodringi (Weisbord, 1964)

Other species according to Fossilworks:

 †Glyptoactis aversa (Pilsbry and Johnson, 1917)
 †Glyptoactis carmenensis Clark and Durham, 1946
 †Glyptoactis charanalensis (Olsson, 1931)
 †Glyptoactis metaicha Woodring, 1982
 †Glyptoactis mutabilis (dArchaic and Haime, 1954)
 †Glyptoactis paraguanensis (Hodson, 1931)
 †Glyptoactis serricosta (Heilprin, 1887)
 †Glyptoactis stenygra Woodring, 1982

Notes:

 In some classifications, †Claibornicardia alticostata, or †Venericardia (Claibornicardia) alticostata, is considered †Glyptoactis alticostata Conrad, 1833.
 In some classifications, †Claibornicardia domenginica is considered †Glyptoactis (Claibornicardia) domenginica.

References

External links 
 
 

Carditidae
Bivalve genera